The following highways are numbered 896:

United States
  Delaware Route 896
  Maryland Route 896
  Pennsylvania Route 896